The 1943 NAIA basketball tournament was held in March at Municipal Auditorium in Kansas City, Missouri. The 7th annual NAIA basketball tournament featured 32 teams playing in a single-elimination format. The championship game featured Southeast Missouri State defeating Northwest Missouri State 34–32.

This was the first tournament to feature a championship game between two teams from the same state, Missouri, playing in Missouri. The 3rd place game featured the first overtime in the NAIA Final Four history when North Texas State defeated Murray State 59–55 in one overtime.

Awards and honors
Many of the records set by the 1943 tournament have been broken, and many of the awards were established much later:
Leading scorer est. 1963
Leading rebounder est. 1963
Charles Stevenson Hustle Award est. 1958
Coach of the Year est. 1954
Player of the Year est. 1994

Bracket

  * denotes overtime.

See also
 1943 NCAA basketball tournament
 1943 National Invitation Tournament

References

NAIA Men's Basketball Championship
Tournament
1943 in sports in Missouri